Hexachaetus is a genus of beetles in the family Carabidae, containing the following species:

 Hexachaetus angulatus (Schmidt-Goebel, 1846) 
 Hexachaetus laevissimus Chaudoir, 1878 
 Hexachaetus lateralis (Guerin-Meneville, 1843) 
 Hexachaetus maculatus Tian & Deuve, 2004 
 Hexachaetus maindroni Tian & Deuve, 2006 
 Hexachaetus perroti Tian & Deuve, 2006 
 Hexachaetus prodigus Tian & Deuve, 2006 
 Hexachaetus taylorae Tian & Deuve, 2006 
 Hexachaetus tristis Liebke, 1937

References

Orthogoniinae